Hassa bint Salman Al Saud (born 1974) is a Saudi royal and academic. She is the daughter of King Salman.

Early life and education
Princess Hassa is the only daughter of King Salman. Her mother is Sultana bint Turki Al Sudairi who was King Salman's first wife and first cousin. Her full brothers are Prince Fahd, Prince Sultan, Prince Ahmed, Prince Abdulaziz and Prince Faisal. She is the half-sister of Crown Prince Mohammed bin Salman.

She was named Hassa after her paternal grandmother, Hassa bint Ahmed Al Sudairi.

Although she attended King Abdulaziz University (KAU) in Jeddah for a year during her undergraduate studies, she received her bachelor's degree in English language and literature from King Saud University in Riyadh.

Her exact age is unknown with the AP reporting that as of 2019 she was believed to be in her 40s.

Activities
Hassa bint Salman works a lecturer in the faculty of law and political studies at King Saud University. She has been publicly supportive of her father since he came to the throne in 2015. In 2016 the Princess delivered a keynote address at Al Yamamah University lauding the achievements of Saudi women. She participated in the activities of the Saudi human rights commission. In June 2020 Hassa bint Salman was made the honorary chair of the Saudi Social Responsibility Association.

French court case
In 2016 French magazine Le Point first reported that Hassa bint Salman ordered her bodyguard Rani Saïdi to beat a craftsman for taking a picture of her. The craftsman was called to the apartment in the west of Paris to see to a broken bathroom fixture. In the course of taking reference photographs of the scene he accidentally took a picture in which the Princess could be seen reflected in a mirror. The Princess took offense to this and ordered her bodyguard to beat the man and then forced him at gunpoint to apologize and kiss her feet, an act the craftsman found to be extremely humiliating. He had formerly worked on a bathroom in an apartment on Avenue Foch owned by King Salman. The craftsman testified that the Princess said "Kill him, the dog, he doesn’t deserve to live.” In 2018 a French Judge ordered the arrest of Hassa bint Salman Al Saud.

In September 2019 she was convicted in absentia of armed violence for this incident. She received a 10-month suspended prison sentence and a fine of 10,000 euros. Her bodyguard Rani Saïdi was convicted of violence, sequestration, and theft.

Personal life
On 28 May 2021 she wed Fahd bin Saad Al Saud at the Royal Sea Place in Jeddah.

Ancestry

References

Hassa
Hassa
1974 births
Hassa
Hassa
Living people
Hassa
Saudi Arabian princesses